The Children of the Feud is a lost 1916 silent film drama directed by Joseph Henabery. It was produced by D. W. Griffith(his Fine Arts Film Company) and released through Triangle Film Corporation.

Cast
Charles Gorman - Pap Clayton
Dorothy Gish - Sairy Ann
Violet Radcliffe - Clayton child
Beulah Burns - Clayton child
Thelma Burns - Clayton child
Mae Giraci - Clayton child (*as Tina Rossi)
Georgie Stone - Clayton child
Allan Sears - Jed Martin (*A. D. Sears)
F. A. Turner - Judge Lee Cavanagh
Sam De Grasse - Dr. Richard Cavanagh
Alberta Lee - Mrs. Cavanagh
Elmo Lincoln - Bad Bald Clayton

References

External links

lobby poster(archived)

1916 films
American silent feature films
Lost American films
American black-and-white films
Films directed by Joseph Henabery
Silent American drama films
1916 drama films
Lost drama films
1916 lost films
1910s American films